French legislative elections took place on 4 and 11 March 1973 to elect the fifth National Assembly of the Fifth Republic.

In order to end the May 1968 crisis, President Charles de Gaulle dissolved the National Assembly and his party, the Gaullist Party Union of Democrats for the Republic (UDR), obtained the absolute majority of the seats. Nevertheless, the failure of his 1969 referendum caused his resignation. His former Prime minister Georges Pompidou was elected President of France.

In order to respond to the discontent expressed during May 1968, Jacques Chaban-Delmas, the left-wing Gaullist who led the cabinet, promoted a programme of reforms for the advent of a "New Society", which advocated social dialogue and political liberalisation. This worried the conservative part of the Presidential Majority and Pompidou himself. Furthermore, Chaban-Delmas was accused, by the presidential circle, to want strengthen his powers to the detriment of Pompidou. In 1972, Chaban-Delmas is replaced by Pierre Messmer, a classical and conservative Gaullist.

After Gaston Defferre's catastrophic result in the 1969 presidential election, the SFIO was replaced by the Socialist Party (PS), formed by the SFIO's merger with an array of political clubs on the democratic left. Two years later, François Mitterrand's Convention of Republican Institutions joined the PS. He took the party's lead during the Epinay Congress, and proposed to form an alliance with the French Communist Party (PCF). In order to prepare the legislative elections, Communists and Socialists signed the Programme commun.

The Radical Party split over the question of the Programme commun. The left-wing minority joined the "Union of Left" and founded the Movement of the Radical-Socialist Left (MGRS). The majority created the Reforming Movement with a part of the center-right. This new group claimed its independence towards the "Union of Left" and the Presidential Majority.

The Programme commun was the main issue of the campaign. Its defenders pleaded the necessity to nationalize banks and companies which were in a situation of monopoly. The members of the Presidential Majority denounced a collectivist project and warned against the participation of Communists in the government if the Left won. The Reforming Movement tried to express a third way rejecting the Marxism of the Left and the Euroscepticism of the Gaullists, but it was obliged to link with the Right to obtain parliamentary seats.

Whilst the left won an increased number of votes and MPs, the Presidential Majority won the election. The Gaullist UDR lost one third of its parliamentary seats due to the growth of the Left and electoral agreements with its allies, the Independent Republicans and Centre, Democracy and Progress. Messmer was confirmed as Prime Minister.

Results 

|-
! style="background-color:#E9E9E9;text-align:left;vertical-align:top;" rowspan=2 colspan=3 width=600 |Parties and coalitions
! style="background-color:#E9E9E9;text-align:center;" colspan=2 |1st round
! style="background-color:#E9E9E9;text-align:center;" colspan=2 |2nd round
! style="background-color:#E9E9E9" rowspan=2|Total seats
|-
! style="background-color:#E9E9E9;text-align:right;" |Votes
! style="background-color:#E9E9E9;text-align:right;" |%
! style="background-color:#E9E9E9;text-align:right;" |Votes
! style="background-color:#E9E9E9;text-align:right;" |%
|-
|style="background-color:#0000C8"|
| style="text-align:left;" | Union of Republicans for Progress (Union des républicains de progrès)
Union of Democrats for the Republic (Union des démocrates pour la République)
Independent Republicans (Républicains indépendants)
Centre, Democracy and Progress (Centre, démocratie et progrès)
| style="text-align:right;" | URP
| style="text-align:right;" | 8,242,661
| style="text-align:right;" | 34.68
| style="text-align:right;" | 10,701,135
| style="text-align:right;" | 45.62
| style="text-align:right;" | 272
183
55
34
|-
|style="background-color:#7FFFD4"|
| style="text-align:left;" | Reforming Movement (Mouvement réformateur)
| style="text-align:right;" | MR
| style="text-align:right;" | 2,979,781
| style="text-align:right;" | 12.54
| style="text-align:right;" | 1,631,978
| style="text-align:right;" | 6.96
| style="text-align:right;" | 30
|-
|style="background-color:#4C4CB0"|
| style="text-align:left;" | Presidential Majority (Majorité présidentielle)
| style="text-align:right;" | MAJ
| style="text-align:right;" | 784,735
| style="text-align:right;" | 3.30
| style="text-align:right;" | 337,399
| style="text-align:right;" | 1.44
| style="text-align:right;" | 12
|-
|style="background-color:#4C4CB0"|
| style="text-align:left;" | Miscellaneous Right
| style="text-align:right;" | DVD
| style="text-align:right;" | 671,505
| style="text-align:right;" | 2.83
| style="text-align:right;" | 21,053
| style="text-align:right;" | 0.09
| style="text-align:right;" | 0
|- style="background-color:lightblue"
|style="text-align:left;" colspan=2|Total Right ("Presidential Majority" and MR)
|
| style="text-align:right;" | 12,678,682
| style="text-align:right;" | 53.34
| style="text-align:right;" | 12,691,565
| style="text-align:right;" | 54.11
| style="text-align:right;" | 314
|-
|style="background-color:#FF0000"|
| style="text-align:left;" | French Communist Party (Parti communiste français)
| style="text-align:right;" | PCF
| style="text-align:right;" | 5,085,108
| style="text-align:right;" | 21.39
| style="text-align:right;" | 4,893,876
| style="text-align:right;" | 20.86
| style="text-align:right;" | 73
|-
|style="background-color:#E75480"|
| style="text-align:left;" | Socialist Party (Parti socialiste) – Movement of the Radical-Socialist Left (Mouvement de la gauche radicale-socialiste) 
| style="text-align:right;" | PS-MRG
| style="text-align:right;" | 4,559,241
| style="text-align:right;" | 19.18
| style="text-align:right;" | 5,564,610
| style="text-align:right;" | 23.72
| style="text-align:right;" | 102
|-
|style="background-color:#DE3163"|
| style="text-align:left;" | Unified Socialist Party (Parti socialiste unifié)
| style="text-align:right;" | PSU
| style="text-align:right;" | 778,195
| style="text-align:right;" | 3.27
| style="text-align:right;" | 114,540
| style="text-align:right;" | 0.49
| style="text-align:right;" | 1
|-
|style="background-color:#DA7B8B"|
| style="text-align:left;" | Miscellaneous Left
| style="text-align:right;" | DVG
| style="text-align:right;" | 668,100
| style="text-align:right;" | 2.81
| style="text-align:right;" | 191,441
| style="text-align:right;" | 0.82
| style="text-align:right;" | 0
|- style="background-color:pink"
|style="text-align:left;" colspan=2|  Total "Union of Left"
|
| style="text-align:right;" | 11,090,644
| style="text-align:right;" | 46.66
| style="text-align:right;" | 10,764,467
| style="text-align:right;" | 45.89
| style="text-align:right;" | 176
|-
|
| style="text-align:left;" | Total
|
| style="text-align:right;" | 23,769,326
| style="text-align:right;" | 100.00
| style="text-align:right;" | 23,456,032
| style="text-align:right;" | 100.00 	 
| style="text-align:right;" | 490
|-
| style="text-align:left;" colspan=8 | Abstention: 18.76% (1st round); 18.11% (2nd round)
|}

National Assembly by Parliamentary Group

In July 1974, the Centrist Union group merged with the RDS group to form the Reformers, Centrists and Social Democrats Group (RCDS).
The UDR group evolved into the RPR group in 1976.

1973
1973 elections in France
March 1973 events in Europe